Philip or Phil King may refer to:

 Philip Gidley King (1758–1808), British colonial administrator
Phillip Parker King  (1791–1856), son of the above, Naval officer and Australian politician
Philip King (Australian politician) (1817–1904), named Philip Gidley King after his grandfather above, Australian politician
 Philip King (American football) (1872–1938), American football player, coach, and lawyer
 Philip Burke King (1903–1987), American geologist 
 Phil King (cricketer) (1915–1970), English cricketer
 Philip King (playwright) (1904–1979), British playwright and actor
 Philip King (historian) (1925–2019), American Roman Catholic priest, historian, and academic
 Phil King (American football) (1936–1973), American football player
 Philip King (musician) (born 1952), Irish musician, film maker, and broadcaster
 Philip King (priest) (1603–1667), English academic and Anglican churchman
 Phil King (Texas politician) (born 1956), American politician and jurist
 Phil King (musician) (born 1960), English bass guitarist
 Phil King (footballer) (born 1967), British footballer
 Felipe VI (born 1968), King of Spain
 Philippe of Belgium (born 1960), King of Belgium

See also
 Phillip King (disambiguation)